Starry may refer to:
 
Starry (drink), a beverage sold by PepsiCo 
Starry (The Killjoys album), 1994
Starry (Purr Machine album), 2007
Donn A. Starry (1925–2011), United States Army general
Starry Lee (born 1974), Hong Kong politician
Starry Internet, a fixed wireless internet service provider

See also

Star (disambiguation)